Good Riddance may refer to:

 Good Riddance (film), Les Bons débarras, 1979 French-language Canadian drama film directed by Francis Mankiewicz
 Good Riddance (band), California punk band
 "Good Riddance (Time of Your Life)", song by Green Day
 Good Riddance (album), a 2023 album by Gracie Abrams